Balatonites is a genus of extinct cephalopods belonging to the ceratitid family Balatonitidae. There are at least four known species: B. balatonicus, B. oyama, B. shoshonensis, and B. zitteli.

The shell of Balatonites is essentially evolute, coiled with earlier whorls showing, and is laterally compressed with flattish sides and a roof-like venter. The sides are covered with radial ribs that have tubercles generally arranged in umbilical, median and ventral rows.

Balatonites has been found in Hungary, the Alps, Balkans, Germany, Japan, and Nevada.

References 

 Arkell, et al., 1957. Mesozoic Ammonoidea. Treatise on Invertebrate Paleontology part L, Ammonoidea.
 Paleobiology Database Balatonites entry
 The Bay Science Foundation Balatonites zitteli  2009-06-15

Ceratitida genera
Ammonites of Europe
Anisian life